Jharna Dhara Chowdhury (15 October 1938 – 27 June 2019) was a Bangladeshi social activist.

Early life 
Chowdhury was born on 15 October 1938 in  Lakshmipur District, East Bengal, British India. Her parents were Promoth Chowdhury and Ashalata Chowdhury. Her home was burned during the Noakhali riots and she fled with her family to Assam. She returned after the riots ended and was inspired by the works of Mahatma Gandhi who had come to the region on a peace mission after the riots.

Career
During the Bangladesh Liberation war in 1971, Chowdhury helped around 500 girls flee the violence to India.

In 1990 Chowdhury took charge of the Gandhi Ashram Trust in Jayag Village, Chatkhil Upazila, Noakhali District.

Chowdhury was the Secretary of the Gandhi Ashram Trust in Noakhali District.

In 2013, Chowdhury was awarded the Padma Shri, the fourth highest civilian award in India.

Chowdhury was awarded the Ekushey Padak, the second highest civilian award, for her contribution to social services in Bangladesh.

In 2016, Chowdhury oversaw the creation of the Gandhi Memorial School in the Gandhi Ashram Trust campus and which was financed by the Gandhi Heritage Sites Mission, an organ of the Indian Ministry of Culture.

Death 
Chowdhury died on 27 June 2019 in Dhaka, Bangladesh. She was being treated at Square Hospital after suffering brain hemorrhage on 1 June 2019. Her last rites took place at the Dhakeshwari Temple in Dhaka. It was kept at the Central Shaheed Minar the next day so people could pay their respects.

Awards
 Gandhi Seva Puraskar (2010)
 Padma Shri, India's fourth highest civilian award (2013)
 Ekushey Padak for social service (2015)
 Jamnalal Bajaj Award (1998)

References

Bangladeshi women activists
Recipients of the Ekushey Padak
Recipients of the Padma Shri in social work
1938 births
2019 deaths
Recipients of Begum Rokeya Padak
People from Lakshmipur District